Telosma procumbens, also known as latok, kapas-kapas, dukep, or sabidukong, among many other names, is a species of flowering plant native to the islands of the Philippines and parts of southeastern China and Vietnam. It is a woody vine with elongated heart-shaped leaves. It bears clusters of yellowish green odorless flowers with five twisted-looking fleshy petals arranged in a star shape. These develop into spearhead-shaped fruits with four thin lengthwise ridges ("wings"). The fruit contains multiple seeds stacked in a column. Each seed has a long white feathery tail that allows it to be dispersed by the wind.

The flowers and immature fruit rinds are eaten in Filipino cuisine, with a taste and texture similar to winged beans or string beans.

See also
Telosma cordata

References

Philippine cuisine
Inflorescence vegetables
Plants described in 1837
Asclepiadoideae